Jalan Serkat (Johor state route J111) is a major road in Johor, Malaysia.

List of junctions

Roads in Johor